The Wasuhorn (3,343 m) is a mountain of the Swiss Pennine Alps, located west of St. Niklaus in the canton of Valais. It is the highest summit in the Jungtal.

On its northern side lies a glacier named Junggletscher.

References

External links
 Wasuhorn on Hikr

Mountains of the Alps
Alpine three-thousanders
Mountains of Switzerland
Mountains of Valais